The JB-4, also known as MX-607, was an early American air-to-surface missile developed by the United States Army Air Forces during World War II. Using television/radio-command guidance, the JB-4 reached the flight-testing stage before being cancelled at the end of the war.

Design and development
Developed under the project code MX-607 at Wright Field in Ohio, the JB-4 was a modification of the GB-4 glide bomb, which had entered service with the U.S. Army Air Forces in 1944. Powered by a Ford PJ31 pulsejet engine, the JB-4 was intended to give an improved standoff range as opposed to its unpowered predecessor. In addition, the addition of an engine made the missile capable of being ground-launched as well.

Utilising primarily plywood construction, the JB-4 utilised television/radio-command guidance, with an AN/AXT-2 transmitter broadcasting a television signal from a camera in the missile's nose to a remote operator. The operator, viewing the transmitted picture, would then transmit commands to the missile via radio, correcting the missile's course to ensure striking the target.

Operational history
The JB-4 entered the flight testing stage in January 1945. The missile also suffered from reliability issues; these, combined with the end of World War II in August 1945, resulted in the termination of the project, with none of the JB-4s built seeing operational service.

References
Notes

Bibliography

External links

 B - Bombs/Bomb Units

Abandoned military rocket and missile projects of the United States
JB-004
Pulsejet-powered aircraft
World War II guided missiles of the United States